This is a list of films produced in Sweden and in the Swedish language in the 2000s. For an A-Z see :Category:Swedish films.

2000s

External links
 Swedish film at the Internet Movie Database

References 

2000s
Films
Swedish

nl:Lijst van Zweedse films
zh:瑞典電影列表